Canons High School (C.H.S) is an academy school situated in Edgware, Middlesex in the eastern part of the London Borough of Harrow. It also has an attached sixth form centre which forms part of the Harrow Sixth Form Collegiate. The school was formerly known as Downer Grammar School.

Admissions
The school currently teaches pupils aged 11 to 18 across six year groups. The school is currently preparing for admission of Year 7 pupils. The current Headteacher is Mr Bartle. The main feeder schools are Stag Lane, Glebe, Little Stanmore and Aylward. The school is oversubscribed.

It is situated just east of the A4140, 300 metres north of the boundary between Harrow and Brent. Queensbury Underground station is close to the south (which is on the Harrow/Brent boundary), and the Jubilee line passes close to the west. Edgware Road (A5) is about a half-mile to the east. It lies in the parish of All Saints', Queensbury.

History

Grammar School
It was formerly known as Downer Grammar School. It was built in 1952 and was the first grammar school to have been built in Harrow after World War II. It was named after Thomas Downer, a magistrate from Harrow, who died in 1502. It was officially opened by the Bishop of Stepney, the Right Rev Joost de Blank in 1955.

High school
In 1974 Downer Grammar School took in the pupils of Camrose Secondary Modern School (which had opened in 1932) to form Canons High School (on the Downer site), with the Camrose site becoming a middle school. Canons had been the name of one of the four houses of the grammar school, each named after a local former country estate. Mr Becker was the headmaster during this time.

The school achieved Technology College status in 2002 and then gained a second vocational specialism.

For many years Canons High School consisted of four year groups, with the first year group being Year 8. However, in September 2008, the school established a sixth form, adding two more years (Year 12 and 13) to the school. A new Sixth Form Centre opened in September 2009. In 2010/2011 the school changed its status from a Technology college to a Science college and changed its intake years to have Year 7's in attendance.

Academy
On 1 August 2011, Canons High School officially gained academy status.

Ofsted
The latest Ofsted report from Canons High School was on 27 March 2019 which was graded 'Requires Improvement'.

Examination Performance

GCSE Examination Performance

 The table above shows the percentage of students gaining five A* to C grades, including English and Maths
 ''The rightmost column shows the percentage of students gaining five A* to C grades, in five core subjects - maths; English; two science qualifications; a foreign language and either history or geography.
 Source: Department for Education
Full GCSE results for the London Borough of Harrow

Notable former pupils

Downer Grammar School

 Long John Baldry, singer
 Roger Bootle, economist
 Tessa Peake-Jones, actress
 Keith Riglin, bishop

Canons High School
 Muktar Said Ibrahim, terrorist
 Jonjo Shelvey, football player
 Stephen Simmonds, financial director
 Young Adz, rapper

References

External links
 Official website
 Former grammar school
 EduBase

Academies in the London Borough of Harrow
Educational institutions established in 1952
Secondary schools in the London Borough of Harrow
1952 establishments in England